Fritz Neumark (20 July 1900 in Hanover – 9 March 1991 in Baden-Baden) was a German economist. He made important contributions to the development of education in the preparation of the income tax laws of economics in Turkey.

Early life
He was born in 1900. As he was Jewish-German, he emigrated to Istanbul (Turkey) in 1933, to avoid the Third Reich. He later moved back to Germany, and served two terms as Rector of the Goethe University Frankfurt (1954–1955 and 1961–1962).

Career
He was faculty member at Istanbul University, where he taught finance and economics. He published many books in the Turkish language. The Fiscal and Financial Committee set up by the European Commission in 1960 under the chairmanship of Professor Neumark made its priority objective the elimination of distortions to competition caused by disparities in national indirect tax systems: Neumark Committee Report.

References

20th-century German economists
20th-century Turkish economists
Academic staff of Istanbul University
Academic staff of Goethe University Frankfurt
1900 births
1991 deaths
Writers from Hanover
Grand Crosses with Star and Sash of the Order of Merit of the Federal Republic of Germany
Jewish emigrants from Nazi Germany
German emigrants to Turkey